Ukrainia may refer to:

 The land of Ukraine, the land of the Kievan Rus
 The land of the Ukrainians, an ethnic territory
 Montreal Ukrainia, a sports team in Canada
 Toronto Ukrainia, a sports team in Canada

See also

 
 Ukraina (disambiguation)
 Ukraine (disambiguation)
 Ukrainian (disambiguation)
 Ukrainians (disambiguation)